The 2016 NAIA Football National Championship was a four-round, sixteen team tournament played between November 19 and December 17 of 2016. The tournament concluded on December 17 with a single game, played as the 61st Annual NAIA Football National Championship Presented by Waste Pro. Waste Pro became the newest title game sponsor in an announcement made October 31, 2015. The game featured two teams that had never before won a national championship, the undefeated #2 Baker Wildcats facing the once-beaten #4 Saint Francis Cougars.

The championship game was played at Municipal Stadium in Daytona Beach, Florida.  This was the 3rd time the championship game was played at this venue after the prior six games were played at Barron Stadium in Rome, Georgia. A total of sixteen teams were selected to participate in the single-elimination tournament from across the country. The field included ten conference champions who received automatic bids. The field was filled with at-large selections that were awarded to the highest ranked teams that were not conference champions. First-round seeding was based on the final edition of the 2016 NAIA Coaches' Poll, with certain minor modifications given based on geographic considerations. Each subsequent round was re-seeded based on the rankings of all teams advancing to that round.

Quarterfinal pairings were announced by the NAIA on November 20, a day after the first round results were known.

Semifinal pairings were confirmed by the NAIA on November 26, soon after completion of the day's quarterfinal games.

Junior quarterback Logan Brettell of Baker was awarded the Rawlings Award for most valuable player in the NAIA prior to the championship. The St. Francis Cougars won the NAIA national championship, defeating Baker 38-17.

Postseason

Playoff bracket

 * denotes OT

Bowl games

References

NAIA Football National Championship
Saint Francis Cougars football
Baker Wildcats football
Events in Daytona Beach, Florida
December 2016 sports events in the United States
2016 in sports in Florida